UFC Fight Night: Thomas vs. Florian (also known as UFC Fight Night 11) was a mixed martial arts (MMA) event held by the Ultimate Fighting Championship (UFC) on Wednesday, September 19, 2007, at the Palms Casino Resort in Las Vegas, Nevada.  It was broadcast live in the United States and Canada on Spike TV as a lead-in to the debut of The Ultimate Fighter 6.

Background
The main event was originally expected to be a rematch between The Ultimate Fighter 1 contestants Chris Leben and Mike Swick.  Leben, however, chose to decline the fight offer (Leben later claimed that his managers turned down the fight without his knowledge on an Ultimate Fighter 1 reunion episode).  Swick was to be featured on the main card in a match against Canadian fighter Jonathan Goulet, who confirmed the bout on July 18 to The Fight Network. Reports indicate that veteran UFC fighter Chris Lytle was also considered for the bout. However, Swick pulled out of the bout on September 2, 2007 due to a rib injury. Goulet faced  Dustin Hazelett instead.

The card was rescheduled to feature a lightweight main event bout between Din Thomas and Spencer Fisher.  However, on August 7, Fisher announced via his MySpace page that he was withdrawing from the event due to a staph infection in his knee.  Former title challenger Kenny Florian replaced Fisher in the main event.

Chris Leben remained on the fight card; he appeared in a middleweight match with Terry Martin.  Nate Quarry, the first cast member of The Ultimate Fighter reality series to challenge for a UFC championship, also returned to the UFC after nearly a two-year layoff following his match against Rich Franklin at UFC 56.

Results

Bonus awards
Fighters were awarded $40,000 bonuses.

Fight of the Night: Cole Miller vs. Leonard Garcia
Knockout of the Night: Chris Leben
Submission of the Night: Dustin Hazelett

See also
 Ultimate Fighting Championship
 List of UFC champions
 List of UFC events
 2007 in UFC

References

External links

Official event page

UFC Fight Night
2007 in mixed martial arts
Mixed martial arts in Las Vegas
2007 in sports in Nevada
Palms Casino Resort